Not Going Out is a British television sitcom that has aired on BBC One since 2006, and has 12 series, making it the second-longest-running British sitcom in terms of number of series (behind the longest-running sitcom worldwide, Last of the Summer Wine). It stars Lee Mack and Sally Bretton with Geoffrey Whitehead, Deborah Grant, Hugh Dennis, and Abigail Cruttenden. The series has previously starred Megan Dodds, Miranda Hart, Tim Vine, Katy Wix and Bobby Ball.

Production
Lee Mack and Andrew Collins were the initial writers, with Paul Kerensa, Simon Evans and Daniel Peak joining the team in later series. Mack is the last remaining actor from the original cast, and the only actor to appear in every episode.

The show was cancelled by the BBC in 2009, whilst the third series was still airing, but the decision was later reversed due to a combination of strong DVD sales and an online petition. This led to the show receiving a renewal for a fourth series which aired from 6 January 2011.

The eleventh series premiered on 8 January 2021 and concluded on 5 February 2021. The series consists of five episodes and was preceded by a New Year’s special, which aired on 30 December 2020.  The show had an additional two series commissioned in June 2019, taking the total number of episodes up to 100.

The show currently uses the Chiswick Playhouse to present pre-production script read-throughs, by the cast, to the public.

Synopsis
The series focuses on Lee Mack, who plays a fictional version of himself: an unambitious man in his late thirties living as a lodger in a flat in the London Docklands. Originally from Chorley, Lancashire (which is approximately 20 miles from Southport, Mack's real-life birthplace), Lee is a negligent, unmotivated layabout. Frequently between jobs, he spends most of his days on his sofa watching television or at the local pub with his best friend, Tim Adams (Tim Vine), whom he has known for 15 years. Tim is an accountant from Henley-on-Thames who owns the flat in which Lee is a lodger. Lee is also noted for his cheeky wit and for having a very troubled relationship with his father, with whom he shares many traits and who says that Lee was unplanned and resulted in the end of his marriage.

Very often, the only thing that can get Lee off of his sofa and active is his efforts to impress the girl of his dreams. In the first series, this girl is Kate (Megan Dodds), Lee's feisty American landlady, with whom he frequently has conflict but otherwise has a close relationship. Kate is Tim's ex-girlfriend–– he left her for a 23-year-old named Emma (whom Lee and Kate frequently suggest looked a lot younger), but he is single again after Emma left him.

In Series 2, with Dodds having left the show, Kate moves back to the United States. Lee's affections soon turn to Tim's sister, Lucy (Sally Bretton), who is a decade younger than Tim. Lucy buys the flat – much to Tim's annoyance – after having spent ten years living in Switzerland. She shares Kate's feisty nature and quick wit, and her interactions with Lee are very similar. Although his frequent laziness annoys her, Lucy sometimes appears to enjoy Lee's presence in the flat, largely because of his company and his willingness to help her out of an awkward situation. Tim soon finds himself drawn into Lee's many schemes to impress Lucy, most of which backfire, fail to impress her or land them in trouble. Often, Lee finds himself confiding in his friend and cleaner, Barbara (Miranda Hart), about his many problems.

Later on in the series, Tim forms a relationship with Daisy (Katy Wix), an incredibly dim-witted, but likeable, young woman. In Series 3, Daisy becomes a regular character. Meanwhile, Lucy considers marrying an Eastern European refugee in a marriage of convenience, until he marries Barbara instead. Later on, Lee's father, Frank (Bobby Ball) returns to try to make amends with his son. In Series 4, Lee continues his antics to impress Lucy. In the series finale, Lee gets hit by a car and falls into a coma. Lee's actions to impress Lucy continue well into Series 5, when they both think they accidentally slept together after drinking potato hooch.

In Series 6, after Vine quit the series, Tim was written out of the show. In the opening dialogue of the series, it is explained that he has been given a work placement in Germany. Daisy continues her friendship with Lucy and Lee, and her naivety often gets them in trouble. With Tim's absence, Lee often finds himself listening to suggestions from Daisy on how to impress Lucy, which include acting as a test subject for her psychology course. This leads to Lee both finding out that he was an unplanned child and held responsible for the breakdown in his parents' marriage, and getting a girlfriend, who develops a Fatal Attraction-esque crush on him. Lee comes close to admitting his feelings to Lucy several times over the course of the series, particularly at the end of episodes Therapy and Play, but although she is receptive, he changes his mind each time.

In Series 7, neighbour Toby (Hugh Dennis) lies to Lee, saying Lucy has had a date, after which Lee tells Lucy that he loves her and asks Lucy to marry him. She agrees and they marry in the finale of Series 7; Tim Vine makes a brief guest reappearance. In the 2015 Christmas Special, Lucy gives birth to her and Lee's first child.

In Series 8, Lee and Lucy have been married for eight years; the series is set seven years after the 2015 Christmas special. They have moved out of the flat and now live in a house in Walton-on-Thames, Surrey (Mack lives in the nearby village of East Molesey in real life). They now have three children, seven-year-old Charlie and five-year-old twins Benji and Molly. Daisy is no longer in Lee and Lucy's lives, but the couple remain friends with Toby and Anna. They are also in touch with Lucy's parents, Geoffrey and Wendy, and with Lee's feckless father, Frank, until his death is confirmed at the beginning of the twelfth series.

Cast

Main Characters

Recurring Characters

 Lee and Lucy are played by Thomas Gater and Ruby Stokes during flashbacks to childhood.
 Geoffrey was played by Timothy West in series two and three.
 Miranda Hart played an acupuncturist in series one.

Episodes

Series 1–7: Docklands era
Lee is a juvenile and lazy slacker, who goes from one job to another, living off the good graces of his Californian landlady Kate (Megan Dodds), with whom he shares a flat in London. It is not long before they find that their friendship is changing into something more. The situation is somewhat complicated by the fact that Lee's best friend Timothy Gladstone Adams (Tim Vine), an accountant from Henley, is Kate's ex-boyfriend (they broke up when he cheated on her with 23-year-old Emma) and he wants to repair their relationship. Lee is torn between pursuing his romantic feelings for Kate and remaining loyal to his increasingly paranoid best friend.

Kate has gone back to America in series two, leaving Tim with a flat and lodger he cannot afford to keep. Tim's sister Lucy Adams (Sally Bretton), a head hunter recently back from ten years abroad, buys the flat and becomes the new landlady and flatmate to Lee. Tim also hires a cleaner, Barbara (Miranda Hart), to clean the flat. In Gay, the series' second episode, 51-year-old Guy first appears and he soon becomes Lucy's boyfriend. Lee, now an ice-cream seller, later appears to fall for Lucy. In the last episode, Tim and Lee are convinced Guy is a gangster and has been smuggling diamonds, but it turns out that he was having a diamond engagement ring made for Lucy planning to propose on a romantic holiday. Lee leaves the airport thinking Lucy has said yes to Guy, but she returns saying that she was too young to get married and that she had split up with Guy. There was also a Christmas Special in 2007 which introduced Tim and Lucy's parents - Wendy (Deborah Grant) and Geoffrey (Geoffrey Whitehead) - for the first time. In episode 6, Lee meets a ditzy woman called Daisy at speed dating, who later appeared to fall for Tim. Although at the time it seems that she will be a one-time character, she reappears in the Christmas special as Tim's girlfriend and returns in series three.

The third series sees Lee trying to pursue Lucy. Usually encouraged by Barbara, he invariably ends up making things worse for himself. We also witness Lucy questioning her sexuality, which worries Lee. Daisy also becomes more of a fixture in series three. In the last episode, Lucy is about to marry Pavlov, a mechanic, so he can stay in the country. However, she realises that she's made a mistake, and Lee gets Barbara to marry Pavlov instead; the last scene is of them driving off together for their honeymoon in India. Barbara is seen back in the flat, wanting to go off with Lee's dad, Frank, who is seen in the last episode, which was broadcast as a Christmas Special on 23 December 2009. Lucy and Lee kiss under the mistletoe.

A fourth series of six episodes was filmed from late September to early November 2010. Miranda Hart did not return as Barbara, as filming of the second series of her own sitcom Miranda was also taking place. The series began airing on 6 January 2011. The series sees Lee and Tim thrown into a drugs deal after Tim accidentally takes someone else's coat in a nightclub, Lee and Tim discovering that either one of them could have a long-lost daughter, Lee accidentally agreeing to let a porn film be shot in his and Lucy's flat, Lee having to organise a fireworks display and return an elderly woman to her son, and Tim and Lucy's parents' rough patch in their 40-year marriage. The series finishes with a near death experience for Lee, who later organises a date with Lucy.

The fifth series, consisting of six episodes, was filmed between November and 22 December 2011 and aired on BBC One from 13 April 2012. A short Children in Need special featuring Sir Terry Wogan followed later in 2012 which was filmed in the recording block for series 6.

The sixth series began airing on 5 April and ended on 31 May 2013. This was the first series since the departure of Tim. In this series, Lucy accidentally kills two rabbits. Other episodes show Lee, Lucy and Daisy ending up stuck in a ski lift with a heavily pregnant woman, Lee getting stalked, Lucy and Lee hosting a children's party, and the main characters find themselves in another of Frank's schemes as he  deliberately sinks a boat for insurance purposes. A Christmas special aired on 24 December 2013, with Mack's real-life son making a cameo appearance as a ghost.

On 5 April 2013, whilst promoting the sixth series of Not Going Out on The One Show, Lee Mack confirmed that a seventh series had been commissioned. Filming for this series began 23 May 2014, and later finished on 25 July 2014. The seventh series aired from 17 October 2014 to 24 December 2014 and consisted of ten episodes, making it the longest series to date. Lee Mack, Sally Bretton, Katy Wix, Bobby Ball, Geoffrey Whitehead and Deborah Grant all reprise their roles as Lee, Lucy, Daisy, Frank, Geoffrey and Wendy respectively, whilst Hugh Dennis and Abigail Cruttenden join the cast as new neighbours Toby and Anna, who soon struggle to share a building with Lee and Lucy.

Lee and Lucy are mugged, attend a dinner party and try to conceive a baby together. In episode 5, Lee and Daisy go on the BBC game show, Pointless. Hosts Alexander Armstrong and Richard Osman make appearances throughout the episode. In episode 9, Lee finally reveals his love for Lucy and asks her to marry him. She says, "Yes". Episode 10 features their wedding day, with Lee, Frank, and Lucy's dad, Geoffrey all ending up in jail after a drunken stag night. There are guest appearances from Tim Vine (who came back for this episode), and Bobby Ball's comedy partner, Tommy Cannon as the vicar. An outtakes episode aired 27 December 2014. Hosted by Mack, Sally Bretton and Katy Wix.

Lee Mack announced on Alan Carr: Chatty Man that there would be a Christmas Special in 2015 and possibly another series in 2016. Talking to BBC News, Mack gave an outline of the special; it follows on from the marriage of  Lucy and Lee in "The Wedding", the most recent episode, and involved a gun. Mack also announced that the special would not be filmed before a studio audience, unlike past episodes, and that he had written its first scenes.

The Christmas special aired on 24 December 2015, where the regular cast were involved in an armed robbery in a department store.  Frank was working as an elf in the Christmas department, when Lee, Lucy and Daisy were with Toby and Anna, who had sent their son away over Christmas. The two security guards were attacked by the armed robber who locked them all in the security room, and Lee had a showdown with the armed robber. The episode ended with Lucy giving birth to Charlie, the couple's first child.

Series 8–present: Walton-on-Thames era
On 24 August 2016, it was confirmed that there would be an eighth series in 2017. It is set seven years after the events of the 2015 Christmas special, and shows how Lee and Lucy cope with being parents to three young children. The series began airing on 13 January 2017, and ended on 3 March 2017. Not Going Out reached its highest ever audience in the opening episode, with a total of 5.52 million viewers.

On 14 November 2017, it was confirmed that a Christmas Special would air in 2017. The episode featured  Lee and Lucy facing a possible yuletide disaster when they discover the perfect present they have bought for their children has already been bought by grandparents. On 4 December 2017, it was confirmed that the Christmas Special would air on 24 December 2017.

At a press screening event for Series 8 on 14 December 2016, it was confirmed that a ninth and tenth series had been ordered by the BBC. The ninth series of Not Going Out began on 8 March 2018.

In series 9, two episodes were classically farcical: in Stolen, Lee and Lucy, having broken into their best friends' house, are forced to hide under their bed when their friends return unexpectedly early – and head straight for the bedroom; in Pants on Fire, lies build upon lies, and embarrassment soars to a crescendo. In the episodes - Pets and Lollipop Man, they deal with common parents' dilemmas, and in Home Improvements and Escape Room they interact more with their parents – with, naturally, disastrous consequences. In Bust Up, Lucy contemplates having breast augmentation.

On 21 December at 9pm on BBC1 the first live episode of the show was broadcast. The premise was that Lee and Lucy were organising a Christmas show for their children's school, and involved Toby and Anna beginning Tom Lehrer's Elements, but veering off as they "forgot" it into lists of supposed ideas, and building into a row. Replacing the supposedly offended knife thrower as a finale, Lee threw genuine knives at Lucy – on a rotating wheel for the final one. It was judged a great success with high reviews.

Series 10 began broadcasting on 15 April 2019 on BBC One, moving to Monday nights as opposed to its usual Friday night slot.

An eleventh series was announced in 2019 for 2020; however, it was postponed until 2021. A further two series were also announced (Series twelve and thirteen) for 2021 and 2022. The eleventh series was the last series to feature Bobby Ball as Frank following Ball's death in October 2020. A New Year's Eve special aired on 30 December 2020 and the regular series began on 8 January 2021, consisting of five episodes (and a Christmas special on 23 December 2021).

Mack had previously said that the twelfth series (airing early 2022) of Not Going Out could begin with a funeral for Bobby Ball. He has also said that Tommy Cannon (Ball's famous comedy double act partner in Cannon and Ball) could play the vicar. Cannon had previously played the vicar at Lee and Lucy's wedding. Mack said it would be a "marvellous thing to do" considering the fact that Ball's real funeral venue was limited, due to Covid-19 restrictions and the limited number of people who could attend. This idea did not go ahead, as the first episode took place over a year after Frank's death; however, series 12 episode 1 was a tribute to Ball.

In 2022, Bretton was absent in the episode 'Jury'. This is her only absence from the series since her first appearance in Series 2, Episode 1.

The BBC have commissioned a 13th series with 6 episodes, and premiered at The Theatre At The Tabard, presumably to record the laugh track for the episodes. It is expected to air in Autumn 2023.

Production
Most of each episode was shot on set in front of an audience at Teddington Studios. There are two main sets: the flat/house and the bar/coffee shop that Lee frequently visits. Outdoor shots and real indoor location shots have also been used on occasion. The fourth and fifth series were shot at the BBC Television Centre. The sixth and seventh series saw filming return to Teddington Studios. International distribution is handled by Avalon who also produce the series. From Series 5 onwards, Not Going Out was produced in association with Lee Mack's own company, Arlo Productions (named after his son). The 2015 Christmas special was filmed on location in Wimbledon, in a department store, and was screened in London to record the laugh track. After Teddington Studios closed, series 8 was filmed at BBC Elstree Centre and series 9 and 10 were filmed at Pinewood Studios.

In series 6, for the episode entitled Boat, production visited the Port of Ramsgate in Kent to film part of the episode where Lee's dad, Frank (Bobby Ball), has bought a boat and invites Lee and his friends down to Eastbourne for the weekend. When they arrive, the boat is not what everyone expected.

The show is filmed in HDTV and, since series 4, airs simultaneously on BBC One HD. Previous to this, the show was not simulcast on BBC HD, but shown on BBC HD 30 minutes after the BBC One airing.

A lot of the humour is based on word play and double entendres delivered in a deadpan manner. This is a comedy style Mack and Vine have used both in stand-up and in The Sketch Show, to the extent that an occasional one-liner from their solo performances is slipped in. This is mostly one-sided, with Kate and later Lucy typically being the victims of the joke. Sight gags are also frequently used, while verbal gags and witticisms are incorporated into almost every line of script.

For the first series, episodes were written by Mack and Andrew Collins, with members of the cast credited for additional material. Because the eight episodes of the second season had to be written and filmed in a short space of time, Avalon Television brought in Nick Stacey, Paul Kerensa and Simon Evans to join the writing team. Mack, Collins and Stacey concentrated on writing the main body of the episodes whilst Kerensa and Evans were involved in storylining, rewriting and 'gagging up' the episodes. The third series saw the writing team expanded, with Darin Henry, Daniel Peak, and Simon Dean contributing to the main episodes (all co-written with Mack). The "gag writing" team was also expanded, from two members to as many as eight, not counting the main writers, on a single episode. Milton Jones was among the additional writers of the show.

In the original pilot of the series, which has not been aired, the part of Kate was played by Catherine Tate. However, due to the success of The Catherine Tate Show, the American actress Megan Dodds was cast in the role and the character developed accordingly.
The theme song is performed by Frank Sinatra impersonator Stephen Triffitt.

The flat in which Lee and Kate/Lucy lived from 2006 to 2015 is No. 17. In a DVD commentary for the first series, it was mentioned that "Number 17" was originally considered as a title for the series, before the name "Not Going Out" was decided upon.

DVD releases
Although filmed and broadcast in HD, no Blu-rays have been released to date. All episodes up to the end of Series 4 feature different video post-production to the broadcast versions, giving them a US-style 'filmlook' effect, however this was dropped from the Series 5 DVD onwards. The episodes Movie and Drunk are slightly extended for DVD, featuring shots and lines cut or censored for their original BBC One transmission. Some music tracks are replaced by soundalikes for release.

Not Going Out 6 does not include the 2013 Christmas Special, "The House". It is however included on The Christmas Specials and The Complete Series 1–7.

References

External links

2006 British television series debuts
2000s British romantic comedy television series
2000s British sitcoms
2010s British romantic comedy television series
2010s British sitcoms
2020s British romantic comedy television series
2020s British sitcoms
BBC romance television shows
BBC television sitcoms
British television series revived after cancellation
English-language television shows
Television series about dysfunctional families
Television series about marriage
Television series about siblings
Television series by ITV Studios
Television shows set in London
Television series by Little Brother Productions
Television shows shot at BBC Elstree Centre
Television shows shot at Teddington Studios
Television shows filmed at Pinewood Studios